Krisztián Bártfai (born July 16, 1974) is a Hungarian sprint canoer who competed from the early 1990s to 2001. Competing in three Summer Olympics, he won a bronze medal in the K-2 1000 m event at Sydney in 2000.

Bártfai also won ten medals at the ICF Canoe Sprint World Championships with a gold (K-4 200 m: 1995), six silvers (K-2 500 m: 1995, K-2 1000 m: 2001, K-4 200 m: 1997, K-4 500 m: 1998, K-4 1000 m: 1995, 1998), and three bronzes (K-2 200 m: 1995, K-2 500 m: 1997, 1998).

Having retired from his professional sport activities he pursued his career as a professional pilot. Currently he works as Captain for one of the Middle East's premium airlines.

References

1974 births
Canoeists at the 1992 Summer Olympics
Canoeists at the 1996 Summer Olympics
Canoeists at the 2000 Summer Olympics
Hungarian male canoeists
Living people
Olympic canoeists of Hungary
Olympic bronze medalists for Hungary
Olympic medalists in canoeing
ICF Canoe Sprint World Championships medalists in kayak
Medalists at the 2000 Summer Olympics
20th-century Hungarian people